The Lo Nuestro Award for Urban Album of the Year is an honor presented annually by American television network Univision at the Lo Nuestro Awards. The accolade was established to recognize the most talented performers of Latin music. The nominees and winners were originally selected by a voting poll conducted among program directors of Spanish-language radio stations in the United States and also based on chart performance on Billboard Latin music charts, with the results being tabulated and certified by the accounting firm Deloitte. However, since 2004, the winners are selected through an online survey. The trophy awarded is shaped in the form of a treble clef.

The award was first presented in 2003 to Is Back by Panamanian performer El General, who also won the following year. Puerto-Rican American reggaeton duo Wisin & Yandel is the most nominated act, with seven nominations, and also are the most awarded, with four wins. Their winning albums Wisin vs. Yandel: Los Extraterrestres (2009), Wisin & Yandel Presentan: La Mente Maestra (with DJ Nesty) (2010), La Revolucion: Evolucion (2011), and Líderes (2013), also reached number-one at the Billboard Latin Albums chart. Los Extraterrestres also received the Grammy Award and Latin Grammy Award for Best Urban Music Album. Barrio Fino by Puerto-Rican American rapper Daddy Yankee was awarded the Lo Nuestro for Urban Album of the Year in 2005; with the album Daddy Yankee was the first reggaeton act to debut at the top of the Billboard Latin Albums chart and became the best-selling Latin album of the decade (2000-2010) in the United States. Puerto Rican performer Ivy Queen is the only female artist to win the award, receiving it in 2008 for her album Sentimiento (2007). Puerto-Rican American reggaeton performer Don Omar is the most nominated artist without a win, with five unsuccessful nominations. In 2017, Pretty Boy / Dirty Boy by Colombian artist Maluma became the last award recipient, as in the nominations for the 2019 awards, the category for Urban Album of the Year was not included.

Winners and nominees
Listed below are the winners of the award for each year, as well as the other nominees.

Multiple wins and nominations

See also
 Billboard Latin Music Award for Latin Rhythm Album of the Year
 Grammy Award for Best Latin Urban Album
 Grammy Award for Best Latin Rock, Urban or Alternative Album
 Latin Grammy Award for Best Urban Music Album
 Los Premios MTV Latinoamérica for Best Urban Artist

References

Urban Album
Latin hip hop
Awards established in 2003
Album awards